The Battle of Butte-aux-Cailles took place on 24–25 May 1871 between the Paris Commune and Versaillais government forces in the Parisian district of Butte-aux-Cailles.

Bibliography 

 
 

Paris Commune
19th century in Paris
Butte-aux-Cailles
Butte-aux-Cailles
History of Hauts-de-Seine
May 1871 events